Heynea is a genus of trees in the family Meliaceae. Their range is in East and Southeast Asia.

Description
The leaves are spirally arranged. Flowers feature four or five petals. Fruits are one or two-seeded.

Species
 The Plant List recognises 2 accepted species:
 Heynea trijuga  
 Heynea velutina

References

Meliaceae
Meliaceae genera